The 2022 NISA Nation season was the second season of NISA Nation, the National Independent Soccer Association's amateur league.

Teams

Incoming Teams
 AFC Solano
 AFC South Bay
 Aiolikos FC USA Rush
 Allentown United FC
 Atletico Orlando
 Battleborn FC
 Boston Athletic SC
 Capo FC
 Club De Lyon FC
 Deportivo Lake Mary
 Inter United FC
 San Francisco Elite Metro FC
 New York Braveheart SC
 Oaks FC
 Sporting ID11
 Union SC
 Valley FC Raiders
 Winter Haven United FC

Departing Teams
 Chula Vista FC
 New Amsterdam FC II
 New Jersey Teamsterz FC
 Steel Pulse FC
 Valley United FC U23

2022 Teams

Florida Region

Northeast Region

Pacific Region

Southwest Region

Location map

Competition format
The 2022 season saw the addition of Florida and Pacific Regions. In each region, the team with the most points at the end of the season is the champion. There are no playoffs or national championship.

 Florida Region: Clubs play each other three times for a total of 12 matches.
 Northeast Region: Clubs are divided geographically into two groups. Clubs play the teams in their group twice and the teams in the other group once for a total of 10 matches.
 Pacific Region: Clubs play each other twice for a total of 6 matches.
 Southwest Region: Clubs play each other twice for a total of 10 matches.

Standings

Florida Region

Northeast Region

Pacific Region

Southwest Region

See also
 NISA Nation
 National Independent Soccer Association
 2022 National Independent Soccer Association season

References 

National Independent Soccer Association